Baqarabad or Boqrabad may refer to:
Baqarabad, Ardabil
Boqrabad, East Azerbaijan
Baqarabad, Kerman
Baqarabad-e Pir Dusti

See also
Baqerabad (disambiguation)